Vladyslav Serhiyovych Manafov (born 22 April 1993 in Kyiv) is a Ukrainian tennis player.

Manafov has a career high ATP singles ranking of World No. 327 achieved on 20 February 2017. He also has a career high ATP doubles ranking of World No. 127 achieved on 13 February 2023.

Career
Manafov has an ITF junior career high ranking of No. 16 achieved in February 2011 and reached the final of the 2011 US Open boys' doubles event with Maxim Dubarenco, losing to Robin Kern and Julian Lenz in the final, 5–7, 4–6.

Playing for Ukraine in Davis Cup, Manafov has a W/L record of 1–2.

ATP Challenger and ITF Futures finals

Singles: 18 (8–10)

Doubles: 104 (61–43)

Junior Grand Slam finals

Doubles: 1 (1 runner-up)

External links
 
 
 

1993 births
Living people
Ukrainian male tennis players
Sportspeople from Kyiv
21st-century Ukrainian people